Blue Mountain Ballads is a song cycle for a voice and piano composed by Paul Bowles in 1946 on poems by Tennessee Williams who was his friend and mentor. The extended harmonic language of the piano part allows a large degree of freedom in all four songs. The tonality in the music may be obscure yet the harmonic language is accessible to an ear of an average audience of classical music and does not require extended listening experience. The meter and tempo varies within each song separately as well as between the songs.

Heavenly Grass
Range B3-E5, for a medium voice, requires much attention to details. The flowing rhythm requires a good ensemble with a pianist.

Lonesome Man
Range Db3-Eb4, for a medium voice preferably male. Contains blues rhythms and harmonies. Not every voice suits the song.

Cabin
Range, C#4-C#5, fairly easy, folk-like song for a medium voice.

Sugar in the cane
Range, C4-F#5, medium voice. The song is performed from a perspective where it explains that the person's a "hot stuff". Requires many colors in the voice and good acting.

References

External links
Texts of the songs

Compositions by Paul Bowles
Song cycles
1946 compositions